Missing on a Weekend is an Indian investigating thriller film directed by Abhishek Jawkar and produced by Rajesh Patange, Sebastian Joseph and Abhishek Jawkar.

Premise
Missing on a Weekend is  an investigating crime story based in Goa. Police Inspector Ali Ansari (Pavan Malhotra) from CBI has been transferred to Goa to take charge of the current ugly undercover crime space which has troubled the tourism capital of India.

Ansari has now got a new case in the midst of all the chaos, where one guy, Laksh (Karan Hariharan) has been found unconscious on Calangute beach. He is brutally hurt on his head and has lost substantial part of his memory. After the brief investigation, police get to know his whereabouts in Goa. As the police team reaches the resort where Laksh and his six other friends from Delhi are staying, they found one of his friend dead in one toilet of a cottage and all other friends are missing.

Now, Ansari is left with only one suspect-cum-victim-cum survivor, Laksh, who hardly remembers anything that has happened.

Release Date
'Missing On A Weekend' was supposed to hit screens on 1 July, but issues from the censors and Goa Tourism (PR) kept a hold on the release.

CBFC asks for 50 cuts in Missing On A Weekend

‘Missing on a Weekend’ gets release date after censor trouble. The film was finally released on 26 August 2016.

Cast
Karan Hariharan as Laksh Kumar
Pavan Malhotra as Inspector Ali Ansari
Jyotii Sethi as Reeha Banerjee
Dishank Arora as Sub Inspector Ajay Kondse
Mahsa Kooshesh as Tanisha Sehgal
Shiva Dagar as Rishab Singh
Akash Bathija as Prince Chawla
Siddhant Mahajan as Himanshu Malik
Khushboo Kamal as Smriti Yadav
Nikhil Punamiya as news reporter
Dibyendu Bhattacharya in a special appearance as Mukhtaar
Madan Maruti Gadekar as Alvin Lobo
Charul Bawsar as Shama, Ali's wife
Akshay Raj as drug peddler
Ashish Warang as Police Commissioner
Marina Stankovic as foreigner
Maryam Zakaria as dancer (Bairi song)
Chandni Sharma as dancer (Parda Hata song)
Abhinav Sharma as bar-tender
Sanjeev Dhuri as doctor
Omesh Bolke as fisherman

References

External links
 
 Maryam Zakaria to sizzle in an item number for ‘Missing On A Weekend’ 
 Director: 'Missing On A Weekend' has no similarities with 'Talaash' 

2016 films
2010s Hindi-language films